"No Toque Mi Naik" is a song by Argentine rapper Nicki Nicole and Puerto Rican singer Lunay. It was released on March 24, 2021, through Dale Play Records and Sony Music Latin. The song was produced by HoneyBoos, Evlay and Maro De Tomasso. It reached number 16 on the Argentina Hot 100 and has more than 20 million streams on Spotify.

Music video
The music video for the song was directed by La Tara, showing Nicki Nicole and Lunay on ATVs with their friends. The video has more than 20 million views on YouTube. It became number one in YouTube Argentina trends.

Live performances
On April 27, 2021, Nicki Nicole was invited to The Tonight Show Starring Jimmy Fallon, where she performed her first single "Wapo Traketero" and "No Toque Mi Naik" with the participation of Lunay, the video on YouTube already has more than five million views.

Charts

Certifications

References

2021 songs
2021 singles
Nicki Nicole songs
Sony Music Latin singles
Spanish-language songs
Songs written by Nicki Nicole